Tanja Vrabel is a Slovenian football striker currently playing for Pomurje in the Slovenian League. She was the league's top scorer in 2009, 2010, 2011, 2012, 2013 and 2014.

She is a member of the Slovenian national team.

References

External links
 

1990 births
Living people
Slovenian women's footballers
Women's association football forwards
Slovenia women's international footballers
ŽNK Mura players